Nikol Sajdová (born ) is a Czech female volleyball player, playing as a middle-blocker. She is part of the Czech Republic women's national volleyball team.

She competed at the 2014 FIVB Volleyball World Grand Prix, and at the 2015 Women's European Volleyball Championship. On club level she plays for Raben Vilsbiburg.

References

1988 births
Living people
Czech women's volleyball players
Place of birth missing (living people)
Middle blockers